CamTran, originally called the Cambria County Transit Authority operates mass transit bus service within Johnstown, Pennsylvania, Cambria County, and Windber, Pennsylvania, Somerset County, Pennsylvania. CamTran also operates the Johnstown Inclined Plane, which they took over in 1983 from Westmont, Pennsylvania borough. The transit system began operation in 1976, from the remnants of the Johnstown Traction Company. While the Cambria County Transit Authority (CCTA) began operation on July 20, 1976, service did not begin until December 1, 1976. In June 1999, CCTA became CamTran.

Bus Services 
CamTran is the urban division, while CamTran+ is the rural division.

CamTran Urban Service 
CamTran operates 19 routes of its urban division. Most routes begin and end at the Transit Center on East Main Street in Downtown Johnstown. The transit center was constructed in 1983 and features a snack shop where passes can be purchased as well as public restrooms and a parking garage. Sunday bus service began in 2000 and bicycle racks were added to the urban division buses in 2006. In 2008, the Transit Center was renovated, including improvements to the air-handling system as well as electronic messaging boards. In 2011, seven new Gillig buses  were added to CamTran's fleet.

CamTran+ Rural Service 
CamTran+ started in 1978 and was originally called Cambria County Rural Transportation (CART) serves the northern half of Cambria County.  In 2000, CART introduced  Reserve-A-Ride, a service in which, passengers call in and literally reserve the bus for wherever they need to go. Reserve-A-Ride will pick up riders at their door, unlike conventional fixed-route services. This service is subsidized 85% by the Pennsylvania Lottery for persons 65 years or older. In 2002, CART became CamTran+. A new transit center was built in 2003 in Ebensburg to better serve CamTran+, and in 2003, the Ebensburg-Altoona Commuter route was added and the other CamTran+ routes were revised. CamTran+ began participating in the PennDOT Persons With Disabilities project in 2008, where on-demand service is provided to riders with disabilities. The rider pays 15% of the Reserve-A-Ride fare.

CamTran+ operates their rural blue and yellow smaller buses out their office in Ebensburg, PA and are located in the same building with the Cambria County Area Agency on Aging. Most transfers on CamTran+ routes are completed at the CamTran+ Transit Center.

Fleet 
CamTran operates a fleet of 51 buses on a rural and an urban fixed route system.
17 Ford
13 Gillig
8  Champion Bus Incorporated
5  Flxible
4  Chance RT-52
4  Freightliner

Service Routes

Urban routes 
6-Conemaugh/Franklin (discontinued July 2011 merged into *30 Ebensburg/Johnstown)
7-Coopersdale
8-Daisytown (discontinued July 2011)
9-Richland Town Centre
10-Dale/Solomon/Oakland
11-Galleria/Scalp Ave
12-Hystone/Westwood
13-Arbutus/Belmont
14-Moxham/Horner Street
15-Oakhurst
16-Prospect
17-Scalp Avenue/Galleria
18-Downtown Shuttle
19-Southmont/Westwood/Laurelwood
20-Westmont/Brownstown
21-Windber

Rural routes 
30-Ebensburg to Johnstown
31-Patton to Ebensburg
32-Northern Cambria Loop
33-Ebensburg/Cresson/Portage
34-Mainline Shopper
35-Patton/Ebensburg Saturday Shopper
36-Ebensburg to Altoona

Passes/GFI Machines 
CamTran operates bus fare machines manufactured by GFI. According to CamTran in a Summer 2006 Newsletter called camrecorder, these GFI machines were introduced to CamTran in March 1992. They take bus tokens, dollar bills, change, and bus passes. These machines cannot give cash change back, they only give back "change cards" in which customers receive a card that can only be used on CamTran and CamTran+ buses. Customers never get cash back from a CamTran bus.

CamTran+ does not use the GFI machines. Customers have to show their passes to the driver and enter the exact change into the fare box, because even on a change card, it is not possible to get change. CamTran passes can be used on CamTran+ buses, but customers must pay the difference, since the rural fares are more than the urban fares.

CamTran+ passes can be used on CamTran (urban) buses, since the rural passes pay more fare than the urban passes.

References

External links 
 CamTran Transit – official site

Bus transportation in Pennsylvania
Transit agencies in Pennsylvania
Municipal authorities in Pennsylvania
Transportation in Cambria County, Pennsylvania
Transportation in Somerset County, Pennsylvania
Transportation in Johnstown, Pennsylvania